Katerin Xiomara Alfaro Torres (born 29 January 1992) is a Salvadoran footballer who plays as a defender. She has been a member of the El Salvador women's national team.

International career
Alfaro represented El Salvador at two CONCACAF Women's U-20 Championship qualifications (2010 and 2012). She capped at senior level during the 2010 CONCACAF Women's World Cup Qualifying qualification.

See also
List of El Salvador women's international footballers

References

1992 births
Living people
Salvadoran women's footballers
Women's association football defenders
El Salvador women's international footballers